Sant'Antonin is a church in the sestiere of Castello in Venice, Italy.

History 
The church was initially founded by the patrician Badoer family in the seventh century. It was reconstructed in the 12th century, and again in 1680, under designs of Baldassare Longhena. The bell-tower was added in 1750. The chapel on the left, dedicated to St Saba, was frescoed by Alessandro Vittoria on the walls, and in the ceiling by Sebastiano Ricci  with Saints Saba and Antonin. The Chapel’s altarpiece by Lazzaro Bastiani depicts a Deposition. It derives originally from the church of  San Severo.

The Tiepolo family commissioned the decoration of another chapel, with works by Palma il Giovane depicting the life of San Saba. The chapel is said to contain her remains brought here from Acre by Lorenzo Tiepolo during the 13th century War of Saint Sabas. The chapel also has a bust of Alvise Tiepolo by Alessandro Vittoria.

Bibliography 
Marcello Brusegan, Le chiese di Venezia, Newton Compton, 2008. .

External links
 Sant’Antonin. The Churches of Venice. Retrieved: 12 August, 2015.

Antonin
Antonin
Roman Catholic churches completed in 1680
1680 establishments in Italy